Brancaleone at the Crusades is an Italian comedy film directed by Mario Monicelli and released in 1970, the sequel to L'armata Brancaleone.

Plot
The film starts where L'armata Brancaleone has ended. Brancaleone da Norcia (again played by Vittorio Gassman) is a poor but proud Middle Ages knight leading his bizarre and ragtag army of underdogs. However, he loses all his "warriors" in a battle and therefore meets Death's personification. Having obtained more time to live, he forms a new tattered band. When Brancaleone saves an infant of royal blood, they set on to the Holy Sepulchre to bring him back to his father, Bohemond of Taranto (Adolfo Celi), who is fighting in the Crusades. As in the first film, in his quest he lives a series of grotesque episodes, each a hilarious parody of Middle Ages stereotypes. These include: the saving of a young witch (Stefania Sandrelli) from the stake, the annexion of a leper to the band, and a meeting with Gregory VII, in which Brancaleone has to solve the dispute between the pope and the antipope Clement III. On reaching Palestine, Brancaleone obtains the title of baron from the child's father. He is therefore chosen as a champion in a tournament to solve the dispute between the Christians and the Saracens in the siege of Jerusalem. The award for the winner is the former leper, who is in fact revealed to be a beautiful princess, Berta, who adopted the disguise to travel to the Holy Land in relative safety. After having nearly defeated all the Moor warriors, Brancaleone is however defeated by a spell cast on him by the witch, who, having fallen in love with him, could not stand seeing him married with the princess. He therefore starts to wander in despair through the desert, and again Death comes to claim her credit: Brancaleone, brooding and world weary as he has no qualms about dying but asks to be allowed to die in "knightly" fashion, in a duel with the Grim Reaper itself. Death agrees and the confrontation begins... after a fierce exchange of blows Brancaleone is about to be cleft by Death's scythe but is ultimately saved by the witch, who gives her life for the man she loved.

Cast
 Vittorio Gassman – Brancaleone da Norcia
 Adolfo Celi – Re Boemondo
 Stefania Sandrelli – Tiburzia da Pellocce
 Beba Lončar – Berta d'Avignone
 Gigi Proietti – Death, Pattume, Colombino
 Lino Toffolo – Panigotto
 Paolo Villaggio – Thorz
 Gianrico Tedeschi – Pantaleo
 Sandro Dori – Rozzone
 Shel Shapiro – Zenone (credited as Norman David Shapiro)

External links
Film page (in Italian)
Film page (in English)

1970 films
Films directed by Mario Monicelli
Italian historical comedy films
1970s historical comedy films
Commedia all'italiana
Italian sequel films
Crusades films
Films scored by Carlo Rustichelli
Films set in the 11th century
Films with screenplays by Age & Scarpelli
Films about personifications of death
1970s Italian-language films
1970s Italian films